Public housing estates in Hong Kong are the most common kind of public housing in Hong Kong. Typically, estate units are leased to low-income people. There are three organizations that provide housing units. They are Hong Kong Housing Authority (HKHA), Hong Kong Housing Society (HKHS), and Hong Kong Settlers Housing Corporation Limited.

As of 31 March 2016, approx. ⅓ of Hong Kong's population (2.14 million) live in Hong Kong's public housing estates. 760,000 of those units were owned by HKHA while 140,000 are HKHS and 1,400 HK Settlers Housing Corp. Ltd. (Tai Hang Sai Estate)

History

The development of public housing estates in Hong Kong first began in December 1953. To rehouse the fire victims affected by Shek Kip Mei fire, the Resettlement Department built two-story bungalows.

Before HKHA, most public housing units at the time were provided by the HKHS (founded in 1948) and HKS Housing Corp Ltd. (founded in 1950). In 1954, more and more resettlement estates are being built. In the 60s, the committee launched public housing estates. At this point, in the 1980s, the HKHA began to introduce amenities, green space, and leisure facilities. Such examples include Choi Wan Estate, Mei Lam Estate, Butterfly Estate, Sun Chui Estate, and Lok Wah Estate. Since the 1990s, demand for public housing units began to increase. Density increased and the area for green space and facilities decreased. This phenomena can be found in public housing estates north of Tin Shui Wai, like Tin Yuet Estate, Tin Wah Estate, and Tin Yat Estate. In the 2000s, green space and facilities began to increase. Due to the appearance of non-standard housing blocks, the HKHA has introduces facilities for children, gardens, and plazas. The new features are an improvement compared to its early versions.

List of estates

Types/Designs
The designs of public housing blocks are followed as:
First Generation (before 1986):
Single Tower (Ping Shek Estate)
Twin Tower
Slab
Cruciform (Tai Hing Estate and Shun On Estate)
I/H-shaped block
Ziggurat (Butterfly Estate)
Second Generation (1986-1992):
New Slabs
Trident
Linear
Third Generation (1992-2003):
Harmony Block
Concord Block
Harmony Wing 
New Cruciform Block
Interim Housing
Fourth Generation (2003-2012):
New Harmony
New Flexi (Shek Pai Wan Estate)
Fifth Generation (2012–present):
Non-Standard
Here are a list of designs found in the blocks of Hong Kong public housing estates (Note: not all of them will be listed, due to too many designs/types):

Floor plans
Here is a list of floorplans for public housing blocks in Hong Kong:

Photography
The social media boom has made people go inside the public housing estates and take photos. It evolved to include the housing estate background into their videos. The estates involved were Nam Shan Estate, Choi Hung Estate, Lok Wah Estate, Ping Shek Estate, etc. Some of them even set up special sections dedicated to these estates.

In 2018, W. Leung, the man who has travelled to 200 public housing estates and took 200,000 photos inside the estates won a National Geographic award due to one of his photos involving a staircase at Jat Min Chuen. It showcased the beauty of Hong Kong's public housing estates.

Art
Due to the popularity of social media, a lot of foreigners come to Hong Kong's public housing estates. A Japanese artist called Fujiwara launched Engeki Quest at Choi Hung Estate.

Facilities for deaf residents
The housing authority hasn't installed sufficient fire lights for the deaf or residents with hearing loss. These residents have tried to apply but were rejected. The Labor Party and a group of deaf people filed a lawsuit against the housing authority, alleging that they couldn't hear the fire alarms. Chairman Kwok Wing-kin said that people who were deaf or have hearing loss should not be deprived of proper living conditions. Siu Tsan, founder of Silence, has claimed that at least some of the residents having deafness or have hearing loss live in at least 1,000 public housing estates.

See also
Mark Blocks
Shek Kip Mei fire
List of public housing estates in Hong Kong
Public housing in Hong Kong
Home Ownership Scheme & Tenants Purchase Scheme
Public factory estates in Hong Kong

References

Public housing in Hong Kong